Aidan Mark Dodson (born 1962) is an English Egyptologist and historian. He has been honorary professor of Egyptology at the University of Bristol since 1 August 2018.

Academic career 
Dodson, born in London on 11 September 1962, studied at Langley Grammar School (1975–81), before moving to Collingwood College, Durham (1981-2). He completed a BA at the University of Liverpool (1985), and an MPhil (1986, museum practice and archaeology) and PhD (1995, Egyptology) at Christ's College, Cambridge. He began teaching at the University of Bristol in October 1996, also holding the post of Simpson Professor of Egyptology at the American University in Cairo from January to July 2013. His primary research interests concern Ancient Egypt, with a particular focus on dynastic history and chronology, tomb architecture, sarcophagus and coffin design, canopic equipment, and the history of Egyptology; he is also an historian of late 19th and early 20th century navies, and has written on the royal tombs of Great Britain.

He is the author of over twenty books, and 300 articles and reviews.

Dodson was elected a Fellow of the Society of Antiquaries of London in 2003.

Published books

Egyptology
Egyptian Rock-cut Tombs (1991)
The Canopic Equipment of the Kings of Egypt (1994)
Monarchs of the Nile (1995) (Revised Editions in 2001 and 2015)
After the Pyramids (2000)
The Hieroglyphs of Ancient Egypt (2001)
The Pyramids of Ancient Egypt (2003)
The Complete Royal Families of Ancient Egypt (with Dyan Hilton) (2004) (2010, Revised Edition)
Ancient Egypt: Pyramids and Hieroglyphs (2006)
The Tomb in Ancient Egypt (with Salima Ikram) (2008)
Amarna Sunset: Nefertiti, Tutankhamun, Ay, Horemheb, and the Egyptian Counter-Reformation (2009) (2018, Revised Edition)
Poisoned Legacy: The Fall of the Nineteenth Egyptian Dynasty (2010) (2016, Revised Edition)
Afterglow of Empire: Egypt from the Fall of the New Kingdom to the Saite Renaissance (2012) (2020, Revised Edition)
Amarna Sunrise: Egypt from Golden Age to Age of Heresy (2014)
The Royal Tombs of Ancient Egypt (2016)
Sethy I, King of Egypt: His Life and Afterlife (2018)
Rameses III, King of Egypt: His Life and Afterlife (2019)
Nefertiti, Queen and Pharaoh of Egypt: Her Life and Afterlife (2020)
The First Pharaohs, Their Lives and Afterlives (2021)
Tutankhamun, King of Egypt: His Life and Afterlife (2022)

Other books
The Royal Tombs of Great Britain (2004) (2017, Revised Edition)
The Kaiser's Fleet: German Capital Ships 1871-1918 (2015)
Before the Battecruiser: The Big Cruiser in the World's Navies 1865-1910 (2018)
German Battleship Helgoland (2019)
Spoils of War: The Fate of Enemy Fleets after the Two World Wars (with Serena Cant) (2020)

References 

English Egyptologists
Living people
1962 births
Academics of the University of Bristol
Alumni of Collingwood College, Durham
Alumni of the University of Liverpool
Alumni of Christ's College, Cambridge
Fellows of the Society of Antiquaries of London